The 1998 DFS Classic was a women's tennis tournament played on grass courts at the Edgbaston Priory Club in Birmingham in the United Kingdom that was part of Tier III of the 1998 WTA Tour. The tournament was held from 8 June until 14 June 1998.

Finals

Singles

 The singles final was cancelled due to rain.

Doubles

 Els Callens /  Julie Halard-Decugis defeated  Lisa Raymond /  Rennae Stubbs 2–6, 6–4, 6–4
 It was Callens' first title of the year and the 2nd of her career. It was Halard-Decugis' first title of the year and the 10th of her career.

External links
 ITF tournament edition details

DFS Classic
Birmingham Classic (tennis)
DFS Classic
DFS Classic